Thomas Henderson may refer to:

Politicians
 Thomas Henderson (New Jersey politician) (1743–1824), American politician
 Thomas Henderson (New Zealand politician) (1810–1886), New Zealand politician
 Thomas J. Henderson (politician) (1824–1911), United States Congressman from Illinois
 Tom Henderson (Labour politician) (1867–1960), Scottish Labour Cooperative politician
 Thomas Henderson (Liberal politician) (1874–1951), Scottish Liberal Member of Parliament for Roxburghshire and Selkirkshire, 1922–1923
 Tommy Henderson (Thomas Gibson Henderson, 1887–1970), Independent Unionist politician from Belfast

Others
Thomas Finlayson Henderson (1844–1923), British historian, often credited as T. F. Henderson
 Thomas Henderson (1872–?), co-founder, Henderson Motorcycle Company
 Thomas Henderson (American football) (born 1953), American NFL football player
 Thomas Henderson (astronomer) (1798–1844), first Astronomer Royal for Scotland
 Thomas J. Henderson (activist) (1931–2005), also American construction business manager
 Tom Henderson (basketball) (born 1952), American former professional basketball player
 Tom Henderson, founder of the disaster relief charity ShelterBox
 Tommy Henderson (footballer, born 1902) (1902–?), English footballer
 Tommy Henderson (footballer, born 1927) (1927–2013), English professional footballer
 Tommy Henderson (footballer, born 1943), Scottish former professional footballer
 Tommy Henderson (footballer, born 1949), English professional footballer
 Thomas Henderson (cricketer) (1875–1920), English cricketer and surgeon